"Playboy" is a song written by Gene Thomas and performed by Gene & Debbe.  It reached #17 on the U.S. pop chart in 1968.  It was featured on their 1968 album Hear & Now.

The song was produced by Don Gant.  It sold over one million discs and was awarded a gold record in June 1968.

The song ranked #41 on Billboard magazine's Top 100 singles of 1968.

References

1967 songs
1967 singles